The community of Sheffield is located in western Davie County, North Carolina, United States. It is in Clarksville Township on the edge of Calahaln Township.

History 
Thomas Madison Smith was the only postmaster for the Sheffield Post Office starting from February 1, 1893 until January 2, 1907 when the
post office was discontinued. The post office was also a store supposedly built before 1894. Where the name came from has apparently been lost to history. A mercantile was opened in 1948 by Wade and JT Smith, along with a furniture and upholstery business. *** To be verified- Sheffield was named after the original family to settle in the area. The family was originally from Sheffield England and settled in North Carolina. From there, due to the Civil War, the founding family dispersed to Alabama, Texas and Florida. It is believed that General Sherman's southern march and swath of destruction was the catalyst for the family moving.

Sheffield today 

Sheffield-Calahaln Volunteer Fire Department is the center of the community as in many rural parts of North Carolina. The Community Center is available for public use. Sheffield Pallet Company is the only active business today, but the Sheffield music hall opened by John Henry and Ethel Reeves opens sporadically and attracts fans of bluegrass and square dance music.  The local weekly newspaper, The Davie County Enterprise-Record, features a Sheffield-Calahaln news column each week that highlights current events and other community information.

Unincorporated communities in Davie County, North Carolina
Populated places established in 1893
Unincorporated communities in North Carolina